The 2008 AFC Futsal Championship qualification was held in March 2008 to determine 4 spots to the final tournament in Thailand. The top 11 teams of the 2007 AFC Futsal Championship, and the host nation for the 2008 competition, receive automatic byes to Finals.

Groups

Group A

Group B

Qualifiers

Host nation

2007 tournament

Qualification

References

 Qualifying Results

AFC Futsal Championship qualification
Qualification
International futsal competitions hosted by Malaysia